"Irresistible" is a song by British dance-pop singer-songwriter Cathy Dennis, released in November 1992 as the second single from her second album, Into the Skyline (1992). The song was co-written and co-produced by Dennis, but failed to make the success of the previous singles. In the US, the single had three different promo CD singles, each with their own remixes each with a more acoustic song.

Critical reception
Larry Flick from Billboard complimented the song as "another moment of dance/pop pleasure". He noted that "a rolling, funk-style beat supports an infectious chorus and a glistening wash of synths. Dennis' playful vocal gives the tune a necessary lighthearted quality." Randy Clark from Cashbox commented, "Although most would think with the "Material Girl"'s Shep Pettibone and Tony Shimkin as co-writers the effort would take on a heavy Madonna slant, but out of left field, this song comes off more like Amy Grant's "Baby Baby"." 

A reviewer from Music & Media wrote, "Shopping for sensual dance music, with the ambient tone of Madonna's "Erotica"? Try something else from the ladies department, where producer Pettibone is the latest fashion." Ian McCann from NME said, "Absolutely sexy and cutely delightful." Peter Stanton from Smash Hits gave the song four out of five, writing, "A fine return to form for Ms Dennis that should get chartland quaking in its boots again. A glorious singalonga chorus with a sexy groove".

Music video
Its music video was shot on the seashore where she was walking and singing and displaying sea creatures, especially starfish. The video was directed by photographer and art director Zanna.

Track listing
 UK CD single
 "Irresistible"
 "Irresistible" (Xtended mix)
 "Touch Me" (alternative 12-inch)
 "You Lied to Me" (Domination mix)

Charts

Weekly charts

Year-end charts

References

1992 songs
Cathy Dennis songs
Music videos directed by Zanna (director)
Polydor Records singles
Song recordings produced by Cathy Dennis
Songs written by Cathy Dennis